Stephen Ross Theodore (born 18 December 1950) is a former Australian rules footballer who played with St Kilda in the Victorian Football League (VFL) during the 1970s.

Theodore kicked 22 goals in 1970 and was a half forward flanker in St Kilda's losing 1971 VFL Grand Final team. He played a total of ten finals games and kicked nine goals in finals football.

Once his VFL career ended, Theodore joined Tasmanian club Longford in the NTFA.

Theodore returned to Colac to captain coach the newly merged Colac-Coragulac Football Club in the Hampden Football League.

References

Holmesby, Russell and Main, Jim (2007). The Encyclopedia of AFL Footballers. 7th ed. Melbourne: Bas Publishing.

1950 births
Living people
Australian rules footballers from Victoria (Australia)
St Kilda Football Club players
Longford Football Club players
Colac Football Club players